Cinemation Industries was a New York City-based film studio and distributor owned and run by exploitation film producer Jerry Gross.

History
Gross released Girl on a Chain Gang (1966) and achieved success with Cinemation's release of sexploitation films such as Inga and Fanny Hill (both 1968). Among other films, the company has distributed exploitation films such as Shanty Tramp (1967), Teenage Mother (1967), and The Cheerleaders (1973) as well as two blaxploitation films The Black Six (1974), and The Black Godfather (1974).

The company, however, also distributed unexpected smash hit independent films like Melvin Van Peebles' Sweet Sweetback's Baadasssss Song (1971) and Ralph Bakshi's Fritz the Cat (1972). Other films released by the distributor include Peter Fonda's Idaho Transfer (1973), Freddie Francis' Son of Dracula (1974), Alain Resnais' Stavisky (1975), and the film version of Oh! Calcutta! (1972). It handled the U.S. rights for the Italian animated feature The Magic Bird, originally titled Putiferio va alla guerra.

The company went bankrupt in late 1975, and all of its films in its catalog have been distributed by other companies. Jerry Gross resurfaced (after reportedly working as a clerk at a 7-Eleven store) a few years later with a new company, the Jerry Gross Organization.

References

Mass media companies established in 1965
Mass media companies disestablished in 1976
Defunct American film studios
Film distributors of the United States
Film production companies of the United States
1965 establishments in New York City
1976 disestablishments in New York (state)